"Charmless Man" is a song by English alternative rock band Blur and is the fourth track on their fourth studio album, The Great Escape (1995). It was released on 29 April 1996 in the United Kingdom as the fourth and final single from that album, reaching number five on the UK Singles Chart and also charting in Australia, France, Iceland, and Ireland.

The accompanying UK B-sides, "The Horrors", "A Song" and "St. Louis", continued the dramatic change in style for Blur first evidenced on the "Stereotypes" single, being stark and raw, foreshadowing the stylistic shift that would realize itself on their eponymous follow-up album.

Background
The inspiration for the song was a visit by Damon Albarn to his grandmother in Lincolnshire. He stopped off at Grantham railway station and when inside the gentlemen's toilet, he noticed a piece of graffiti on a similar theme to the song's title.

Critical reception
British magazine Music Week rated the song five out of five, picking it as Single of the Week. They wrote, "The fourth and final single from The Great Escape is probably its best track. This should restore Blur's status as a more-than-convincing chart band."

Promotional video

The video was directed by Jamie Thraves. It starts with a man (the Charmless Man, played by Jean-Marc Barr) running down a dark street with a makeshift bandage or wrapping on his right hand, while cross cut edits show Blur playing in a music hall. After the verse which is accompanied by piano, the band are playing in the man's apartment in his bathroom, whilst the man uses an electric toothbrush and uses some red wine as mouthwash. After becoming fully dressed, the man goes out into the corridor, where the band are again. After pushing Damon Albarn out of the way, he enters a lift. The band once again are there. They are also there in the foyer when the man leaves the lift. The members of the band hang around outside, when the man, frustrated at the band following him anywhere he goes, pushes Albarn over and kicks him.

After collecting his car from the valet, the man drives off, hoping to be free from the band. They appear at the roadside twice as the man drives down the street. At the third time, the band are standing in the middle of the road and the man drives straight into them, knocking them all over. Following this latest appearance by the band, he smashes the car windows with his fists in anger.  He is then seen again running on the dark street, with his badly cut hand wrapped, at which point it becomes clear that the earlier scene of him running was out of time sequence.  He staggers into the hall, once again finding it his fate to see the band performing in front of him.   He can escape neither the band nor his own nature.  In the final shot, the camera zooms in onto Albarn's face as the final notes are sung and played and he has a contemptuous smile on his face.

Track listings
All music was composed by Albarn, Coxon, James and Rowntree. All lyrics were composed by Albarn.

UK 7-inch and cassette single
 "Charmless Man"
 "The Horrors"

UK CD single
 "Charmless Man"
 "The Horrors"
 "A Song"
 "St. Louis"

European CD single
 "Charmless Man" – 3:33
 "The Man Who Left Himself" – 3:21

French CD single
 "Charmless Man" – 3:34
 "It Could Be You" (live) – 3:19

Australasian CD single
 "Charmless Man" – 3:33
 "The Man Who Left Himself" – 3:21
 "Tame" – 4:47
 "Ludwig" – 2:24

Personnel
 Damon Albarn – lead vocals, piano
 Graham Coxon – electric guitar, backing vocals
 Alex James – bass guitar
 Dave Rowntree – drums

Charts

Weekly charts

Year-end charts

Certifications

Release history

References

Blur (band) songs
1996 singles
1995 songs
Food Records singles
Parlophone singles
Song recordings produced by Stephen Street
Songs written by Alex James (musician)
Songs written by Damon Albarn
Songs written by Dave Rowntree
Songs written by Graham Coxon